El hijo de Huracán Ramírez (The Son of Hurricane Ramirez) is a 1965 black-and-white Mexican Lucha film co-written directed by Joselito Rodríguez and starring David Silva. It is the third installment of the Huracán film series, following the 1962 sequel, El misterio de Huracán Ramírez.

External links

1965 films
Lucha libre films
1960s Spanish-language films
Mexican black-and-white films
Films directed by Joselito Rodríguez
1960s Mexican films